Aarti Nayak-Kamath is a Hindustani classical music vocalist working in the Gwalior gharana tradition. She has also performed in Sangeet Natak musical drama.

Early life
Aarti Nayak hails from a musical family. Her father was Pt. Ramrao Nayak, a noted vocalist of the Kirana-Gwalior Gharana. Her paternal grandmother was Smt. Mukta Nayak, a devotional singer, while her maternal grandfather Shri. Hanumanth Kamath was a theatre actor.

At the age of 4, Aarti began her initial training in music under the guidance of her mother Mrs. Pratima Nayak. At 6, her advance training in music began under the guidance of her father, a disciple of Pt. Bhaskarbua Ghodge (Gwalior Gharana). The girl's musical talents were noted by her father and by Pt. A. K. Abhyankar – Kirana Gharana (Disciple of Pt. Firoz Dastur) and Pt. V.R. Athavale  (Gwalior Gharana), and they began developing her skills. At the age of 9, she began playing Tabla and Harmonium with no training. She has also learnt Sitar and Bharatnatyam.

Education 
Aarti is a Sangeet Alankar and Sangeet Visharad of Akhil Bharatiya Gandharva Mahavidyalaya Mandal, Mumbai and is a Rank holder. She has also obtained M.A (Music) from the SNDT University, Mumbai and holds a post graduate degree in Commerce.

Performing career
She has been giving successful concerts of Hindustani classical music and semi-classical music including Natyageeta, Bhajan, Thumri, and Tappa under the auspices of many musical organisations across India. Venues at which she has performed include:

 Soorya Festival, Thiruvananthapuram
 Youth Festival by Sangeet Natak Academy
 Kashi Sangeet Samaj – Varanasi, Uttar Pradesh
 Sangeet Nritya Academy Sammelan, Bengaluru
 Pt. Vishnu Digambar Paluskar Samaroha, Hyderabad
 Shani Jayanti Music Festival, Indore
 Temple Music Festival, Bengaluru
 Surashree Kesarbai Kerkar Smriti Sangeet Samaroha, Goa
 Nehru Centre, Worli Mumbai
 Platinum Jubilee Celebration at Gandharve Mahavidyalaya, Vashi, Mumbai

She has also featured in Marathi Sangeet Natak musical drama, playing lead roles in various Sangeet Nataks such as Sangeet Saubhadra, Sangeet Saushay Kallol, Sangeet Yayati ani Devayani, and Sangeet Manaapman.

She has given playback for the national award-winning Marathi film Savalee (2007), which is based on Indian classical music.

Personal life
Aarti is married to Mr. Sudheendra Kamath, an engineer by profession, and they live in Madgaon, Goa.

Awards and recognitions 
 Pt Basavraj Rajguru National youth award
 Yuva Srujan Award (Navasarjan Chetana Puraskar - Music) by Art & Culture dept, Goa Government for the year 2013-14
 Sangeet Ratna  by Kashi Sangeet Samaj, Varanasi.
 Yashadamini Award by Goa Government for achievements in Music
 Giants International Award in recognition for achieving highest standard of work in the field of music.
 SurMani by the Sur Singar Samsad, Mumbai.
 Saraswat Yuva Puraskar, by Kodial Khabar Mangalore, for excellence achieved in the field of music.
 Won the All India Radio competition for Semi Classical Category (1999–2000) & for Light Music Category (2001–2002)
 Vamandaji Puraskar, organized by Vasantrao Achrekar Sanskrutik Pratishthan, Kanakawli, Maharashtra.
 Awarded as Best Singer in the Hindustani Classical Vocal Category in the National Youth Festival, Trivendram, Kerala.
 Awarded as ‘Best Actress’ in Marathi Sangeet Natak by Maharashtra Natya Mandal, Sangli, Maharashtra.

References

External links
 Aarti Nayak website

1983 births
Living people
Singers from Mumbai
SNDT Women's University alumni
21st-century Indian singers
Indian women classical singers
21st-century Indian women singers
Women musicians from Maharashtra